Carebara pygmaea is a species of ant in the subfamily Formicinae. It is found in Sri Lanka, Borneo, Indonesia, Philippines.

Subspecies
Carebara pygmaea densistriata Stitz, 1925
Carebara pygmaea pygmaea Emery, 1887

References

External links

 at antwiki.org

Myrmicinae
Hymenoptera of Asia
Insects described in 1887